The 1992 Vuelta a España was the 47th edition of the Vuelta a España, one of cycling's Grand Tours. The Vuelta began in Jerez de la Frontera, with an individual time trial on 27 April, and Stage 11 occurred on 7 May with a stage from Sabiñánigo. The race finished in Madrid on 17 May.

Stage 11
7 May 1992 — Sabiñánigo to Pamplona,

Stage 12
8 May 1992 — Pamplona to Burgos,

Stage 13
9 May 1992 — Burgos to Santander,

Stage 14
10 May 1992 — Santander to Lakes of Covadonga,

Stage 15
11 May 1992 — Cangas de Onís to Alto del Naranco,

Stage 16
12 May 1992 — Oviedo to León,

Stage 17
13 May 1992 — León to Salamanca,

Stage 18
14 May 1992 — Salamanca to Ávila,

Stage 19
15 May 1992 — Fuenlabrada to Fuenlabrada,  (ITT)

Stage 20
16 May 1992 — Collado Villalba to Palazuelos de Eresma (Destilerías DYC),

Stage 21
17 May 1992 — Palazuelos de Eresma (Destilerías DYC) to Madrid,

References

12
1992,12